Whit Taylor (born January 8, 1960) is a retired college and professional football quarterback. He was an all-Southeastern Conference quarterback for Vanderbilt University from 1979–1982, a period which included a trip to the 1982 Hall of Fame Bowl. His career at Vanderbilt led in 2003 to his recognition as an SEC Football Legend.

After attempting a career in the National Football League, he became a backup quarterback for the Michigan Panthers of the United States Football League and then became quarterback of the Denver Dynamite of the Arena Football League in 1987. In that year he became the first player ever to pass for ten touchdowns in any professional game of American football, a record which stood for over a decade.

Taylor was a principal at Shelbyville Central High School. He is now a vice principal at a local elementary school.

Biography

Professional career
In 1987, Taylor lead the Denver Dynamite to a 45-16 victory over the Pittsburgh Gladiators in ArenaBowl I. Taylor threw four touchdowns during the game, three of them to future Arena Football Hall of Famer Gary Mullen.

After football
Taylor got his start in coaching at the collegiate level, serving as quarterbacks coach at the University of Tennessee at Chattanooga in 1988-1989. He worked as a high school football coach and teacher in the Middle Tennessee area at Shelbyville's Central High School, his high school alma mater.

In 2006, he left coaching to go into educational administration.  He served as the Harris Middle School Assistant Principal for a few years.  He was the Principal of Shelbyville Central High School. He was the vice principal of Eastside Elementary. Whit has now retired from his education career starting in the 2020-2021 school year

References

External links
 AFL stats from arenafan.com

1960 births
Living people
American football quarterbacks
American school principals
Denver Dynamite (arena football) players
Michigan Panthers players
Vanderbilt Commodores football players
High school football coaches in Tennessee
People from Shelbyville, Tennessee
Players of American football from Tennessee